"I Don't Ever Want to See You Again" is a song by American contemporary R&B singer Uncle Sam. It is the closing track on his eponymous debut album and was issued as the album's lead single. The song was written and produced by Boyz II Men member Nathan Morris. Released in October 1997, it was Uncle Sam's only hit on the US Billboard Hot 100, peaking at number six in 1998. The single was certified platinum by the Recording Industry Association of America (RIAA) on April 6, 1998. Worldwide, the song peaked at number eight in New Zealand and reached the top 40 in Australia, the Netherlands, and the United Kingdom.

Music video

The official music video for the song was directed by Christopher Erskin and Nathan Morris.

Charts

Weekly charts

Year-end-charts

Certifications

Release history

References

External links
 
 

1997 debut singles
1997 songs
Epic Records singles
Music videos directed by Christopher Erskin
Song recordings produced by Nathan Morris
Songs written by Nathan Morris
Songs about infidelity
Uncle Sam (singer) songs